The Thunder Lake Trail-Bluebird Lake Trail near Allens Park, Colorado was built in 1926.  It was designed by National Park Service architects and was built by the Civilian Conservation Corps.  It includes Late 19th and Early 20th Century American Movements, Rustic, and other architecture.  The trail subsumes or is associated with Ouzel Lake Trail, the Arbuckle Lake(s) Trail, the Wild Basin Trail, and the North St. Vrain Creek Trail.

It was listed on the National Register of Historic Places in 2008.  The listing included  with one contributing structure.

See also
Thunder Lake Patrol Cabin, also NRHP-listed
Architects of the National Park Service

References

Park buildings and structures on the National Register of Historic Places in Colorado
Late 19th and Early 20th Century American Movements architecture
Buildings and structures completed in 1926
Buildings and structures in Boulder County, Colorado
National Register of Historic Places in Rocky Mountain National Park
National Register of Historic Places in Boulder County, Colorado
1926 establishments in Colorado